Thecla Boesen (22 August 1910 – 11 February 1996) was a Danish film actress. She appeared in 22 films between 1940 and 1982.

Selected filmography
 I gabestokken (1950)
 Forelsket i København (1960)
 Magic in Town (1968)
 Hooray for the Blue Hussars (1970)
 My Sisters Children Go Astray (1971)

External links

1910 births
1996 deaths
Danish film actresses
Actresses from Copenhagen
20th-century Danish actresses